Rhiannon Jeffrey (born October 25, 1986) is a former American swimmer who won a gold medal at the 2004 Summer Olympics.

Swimming career
Jeffrey began swimming at the age of six, and won eight Florida state titles while in high school at Atlantic Community High School in Delray Beach, Florida. She was named state swimmer of the year four years in a row by the South Florida Sun-Sentinel. In 2003, for her senior year at Atlantic, she was joined on the swim team by her younger sister Kirstie.

Jeffrey's first taste of international success was at the 2002 Pan Pacific Swimming Championships where she swam on the U.S. 4x100 freestyle relay team that took a silver medal.  While still a senior in high school, she won two gold medals in the 2003 World Aquatics Championships; swimming as part of the U.S. teams in both the 4x100 and 4x200 freestyle relays.

Jeffrey was highly recruited, and chose to go across the country to the University of Southern California in Los Angeles. Just two weeks before the 2004 United States Olympic Trials, Jeffrey was hospitalized with an abscessed tonsil; she recovered in time to take 4th place in the 200 metre freestyle at the competition, and earn a spot on the 4x200 metre relay team in Athens. In Athens she swam in the preliminary heats of the 4x200 freestyle relay, and when the U.S. team won the final, she was awarded a gold medal.

Retirement
In 2007, Jeffrey left USC and gave up swimming four months before the U.S. Olympic Trials for the 2008 Summer Olympics.  She relocated to Salem, Massachusetts, and took a job with Apple Inc. Jeffrey is currently the head swim coach for the Atlantis Aquatics swim team in Portsmouth, NH.  https://www.teamunify.com/TabGeneric.jsp?_tabid_=176697&team=necsc

See also
 List of Olympic medalists in swimming (women)
 List of University of Southern California people
 List of World Aquatics Championships medalists in swimming (women)

References

External links
 
 
 
 

1986 births
Living people
American female freestyle swimmers
Medalists at the 2004 Summer Olympics
Olympic gold medalists for the United States in swimming
Sportspeople from Delray Beach, Florida
Swimmers at the 2004 Summer Olympics
USC Trojans women's swimmers
World Aquatics Championships medalists in swimming